Gongdeoksan is a mountain of Gyeongsangbuk-do, eastern South Korea. It has an elevation of 913 metres.

See also
List of mountains of Korea

References

Mountains of North Gyeongsang Province
Mungyeong
Mountains of South Korea